Presidential elections were held in Chad on 25 April 2011, after being postponed from 3 April.

Campaign
On 25 March 2011, the deputy spokesman of the opposition coalition, Saleh Kebzabo of the National Union for Democracy and Renewal, announced that "the coalition of political parties have decided to suspend their participation in the electoral commission." Fifteen opposition party-affiliated members of the election commission resigned, posing a threat to the credibility of the elections. According to Chad's electoral code, the electoral commission must have at least two-thirds of its 31 members to constitute a quorum.

Boycott
The major opposition politicians  Kebzabo, Wadel Abdelkader Kamougué of the Union for Renewal and Democracy, and Ngarlejy Yorongar of the Federation, Action for the Republic, announced that they would boycott the "election circus" and urged voters to do so too. Their announcement followed demands for electoral reforms including the issue of new voter identification cards. They also claimed unfair conditions led to a loss in the February 2011 parliamentary elections and that the presidential election would be a "historic fraud."

Conduct
Voting stations were reported to have opened late in N'Djamena because of a delay in the arrival of voting materials and staff.

Results

References

Presidential elections in Chad
Chad
Parliamentary
Chad